Spectres is a 2004 supernatural drama film directed by Phil Leirness and starring by Marina Sirtis, Dean Haglund and Tucker Smallwood.

Plot
Kelly is a 16-year-old suicide survivor, her mother Laura Lee is at a loss when it comes to what should be done next so she takes Kelly away for the summer to a holiday home. But strange things start happening and Kelly starts acting like a different person. Kelly's therapist, Dr. Halsey, seeks the assistance of a psychic.

Cast
 Marina Sirtis as Laura Lee
 Dean Haglund as Dr. Halsey
 Tucker Smallwood as Will Franklin
 Lauren Birkell as Kelly Webber
 Alexis Cruz as Sean
 Chris Hardwick as Sam Phillips
 Loanne Bishop as Suzanne
 Linda Park as Renee Hansen
 David Hedison as William
 Alexander Agate as C.J. Hansen
 Lillian Lehman as Fran Mullins
 Joe Smith as Mark
 Neil Dickson as Wally

External links
 

2004 films
2004 science fiction films
American mystery films
American science fiction films
American drama films
American ghost films
2000s English-language films
2000s American films